Mumbo Jumbo is a roller coaster which opened to the public on 4 July 2009 at Flamingo Land Resort, UK. Mumbo Jumbo is situated in the Lost Kingdom section of the park and has orange supports and black tracks.

Records 
The roller coaster's maximum vertical angle is 112 degrees, making it the world's steepest roller coaster from 4 July 2009 until 16 July 2011. The official park press release stated that the Mumbo Jumbo opening will be attended by representatives of Guinness World Records. Andrea Banfi of Guinness World Records said: "We will be in attendance at the opening of Flamingo Land's new roller coaster and look forward to this new Guinness World Records record in the 'Steepest roller coaster made from steel' category".

This record was previously held by another S&S El Loco, Steel Hawg in Indiana Beach. On 16 July 2011, a Gerstlauer Euro-Fighter roller coaster opened in Fuji-Q Highland named Takabisha featuring a 121 degree drop. This record was once again taken by TMNT Shellraiser at Nickelodeon Universe a clone of Takabisha with a 121.5 degree drop.   The same year, Thorpe Park opened SAW: The Ride, a Euro-Fighter which was the world's steepest for a few days which caused some annoyance for Thorpe Park.

Ride Experience

Elements

The ride
The train pulls away from the station around a 180 degree turn and hits the chain lift. Once at the crown of the chain lift the car navigates round an 's-bend' and another 180 degree turn into the famous 112 degree drop, then travels up a hill completing a 180 turn into some 'trim brakes'. After that the train completes a series of banked turns (360 degrees) and then into a barrel roll and half loop. After exiting the half loop the train rises into some more 'trim brakes'. Once exiting the breaks the train then pulls through a 180 degree banked turn and into a heart line roll. Finally an over banked curve and into the final brake-run.

Name Origin 
The park owners said the name "Mumbo Jumbo" is a tongue-in-cheek description of how other parks boast about their new roller coasters.

Incidents 
On 3 May 2010, one of the cars got stuck on an inverted section of the ride due to a poncho blowing into the wheels. Two female passengers were trapped upside down for 20 minutes before being safely removed from the ride by parks operations team.

References 

Tourist attractions in North Yorkshire
Roller coasters introduced in 2009
Roller coasters in the United Kingdom